Larry Wright may refer to:

 Larry Wright (cartoonist) (1940–2017), cartoonist known for his editorial cartoons
 Larry Wright (ice hockey) (born 1951), retired professional ice hockey player
 Larry Wright (basketball) (born 1954), head coach of the Grambling Tigers men's basketball team
 Larry Wright (priest), British Anglican priest
 Larry Wright (street drummer) (born 1975), New York busker
 Larry Bud Wright (born 1940), American high school football coach
 L. W. Wright (born c. 1948-1949), American confidence trickster

See also
 Lawrence Wright (disambiguation)